Nadia Bisiach (born 25 January 1965), is an Australian former table tennis player who competed at the 1988 Seoul Olympics, the first Olympics to include table tennis.

She competed in both the women's singles and doubles table tennis events, teaming up with Kerri Tepper in the latter. She finished equal 33rd of 48 in the singles event, while she and Tepper came 15th (last) in the doubles competition.

References 

1965 births
Living people
Australian female table tennis players
Olympic table tennis players of Australia
Table tennis players at the 1988 Summer Olympics